Cimon and Pero is a 1630 oil on canvas painting by Peter Paul Rubens, now in the Siegerlandmuseum in Siegen. It shows a return to the subject Roman Charity, which Rubens had previously painted around 1612.

References

Mythological paintings by Peter Paul Rubens
Paintings in the collection of the Rijksmuseum
1630 paintings